På Sporet (lit. 'On the Track') is a quarterly magazine published by the Norwegian Railway Club. The magazine was started in 1969. It is dominated by news and feature articles about domestic trains and rail transport, but also has a limited amount of international news and features.

References

External links
Index of all issues

1969 establishments in Norway
Magazines established in 1969
Norwegian-language magazines
Rail transport magazines published in Norway
Quarterly magazines published in Norway